Hazyna Sport Club   was a Turkmenistan  professional football club based in Ashgabat,  formerly of the Ýokary Liga. It is the football team of the Turkmen State Institute of Economics and Management.

History 
The team was established in February 2015. Taking into account the growing popularity of football among students Football Federation of Turkmenistan made an exception by allowing the team to participate in the Ýokary Liga without a selection in the Turkmenistan First League. The new club was headed by Ahmet Agamyradow. At 2016 Hazyna SK folded, ceasing to exist as a professional football club.

References

Links 
 FIFA

Football clubs in Turkmenistan
Football clubs in Ashgabat
Association football clubs established in 2015
Association football clubs disestablished in 2016